Frank Edward Mailley (August 1, 1916 — April 18, 1975) was a Canadian professional ice hockey defenceman who played in one National Hockey League game for the Montreal Canadiens during the 1942–43 NHL season.

See also
List of players who played only one game in the NHL

References

External links

1916 births
1975 deaths
Canadian ice hockey defencemen
Montreal Canadiens players
People from Lachine, Quebec
Ice hockey people from Montreal
Quebec Aces (QSHL) players
Washington Lions players